"No Favors" is a song by American rapper Big Sean featuring American rapper Eminem for his fourth studio album I Decided (2017). The song was written by Big Sean, Francis Nguyen-Tran, Mark Sebastian, Starrah, The Lovin' Spoonful, Eminem, WondaGurl and John Sebastian and was produced by WondaGurl, Big Sean, and FrancisGotHeat. This song contains samples from "Summer in the City", performed by Quincy Jones featuring Valerie Simpson and was written by Mark Sebastian, Steve Boone and John Sebastian. The song debuted at number 22 on the US Billboard Hot 100, and was later certified platinum by the Recording Industry Association of America (RIAA) on February 12, 2021.

Controversy
In Eminem's verse, he mentions President Donald Trump and says "I'm anti, can't no government handle a commando / Your man don't want it, Trump's a bitch / I'll make his whole brand go under". Eminem also mentions American pop star Fergie, actress Jamie Lee Curtis, and conservative political commentator Ann Coulter.

Charts

Certifications

References

2017 songs
Big Sean songs
Songs written by Big Sean
Eminem songs
Songs written by Eminem
Songs written by Starrah
Songs written by John Sebastian
GOOD Music singles
Songs about Donald Trump
Songs written by WondaGurl